Diana Arno (born 29 January 1984) is an Estonian beauty queen, fashion designer and model who won the title of Miss Tallinn 2009 and 2010 and Miss Estonia 2009 and 2010, and represented her country at the Miss Universe 2009 pageant. 

Arno was born in Tallinn and holds a Bachelor and MBA degree. She speaks Estonian, English and Russian. After winning Miss Estonia 2009 and 2010, she started her career as a fashion designer. She created her own clothing brand DIANAARNO and her first collection, Melted Ice, was created in 2011 to participate in Miss Asia Pacific World 2011, which was held in South Korea.

References

1984 births
Living people
Estonian female models
Estonian beauty pageant winners
Miss Universe 2009 contestants
Estonian fashion designers
Estonian women fashion designers
People from Tallinn
21st-century Estonian women